Igor Skvortsov is a composer of neoclassical, ambient, progressive and new-age music.

Biography
Igor Skvortsov was born in July 1964 in Soviet Union.

Music style
Igor Skvortsov is a composer of neoclassical, ambient, progressive and new-age music. In FilmFreeway, his music is described as "a reflection of feelings, emotions".  Although, as a neoclassical composer, Igor Skvortsov creates "his own universe of subtle and mesmerizing sounds", "his music is a story about each of us", based on FilmFreeway.

Discography
2022: 

- Singles: 
 Forgiveness
 Disavowal
 Immersion

2021: 

- Singles: 
 Meekness
 Self-Acceptance
 Life
 Stream
 Solitude
 Expectation (Jody Wisternoff Remix)
 Voyage
 Expectation (orchestra version)
 Inspiration
 Distance
 Thought
 Transformation

- Album "TRANSFORMATION" (2021) (includes 3 singles: Expectation, Time and Spring Time)

Awards
In 2022, music video “EXPECTATION” received numerous awards at International Film Festivals across the European, Australian and American continents, including: the Best Composer at Arthouse Festival of Beverly Hills in USA, the Best Music Video at Milan Gold Awards in Italy, the Winner at Film in Focus in Romania, the Winner at Best Music Video Awards in UK, the Winner at Emerald Peacock International Film Festival in Russia and the Best Composer at Sydney Indie Short Festival in Australia.

References/Notes and references

External links
www.igor-skvortsov.com

Soviet musicians
Living people
New-age musicians
Ambient musicians
1964 births